Abandoned Places: A Time for Heroes is a 1992 Hungarian dungeon crawler role-playing video game developed by ArtGame and published by International Computer Entertainment for Amiga and DOS platforms. A sequel, Abandoned Places 2, was released in 1993 for Amiga.

Plot and gameplay

The narrative sees a band of four heroes from the land of Kalynthia, to save their homeland from the clutches of the evil arch mage Bronagh.

During dungeon crawls the game switches to a 3D view and plays similar to Dungeon Master.

Development 
Abandoned Places was developed by the founders of Hungarian video game development company ArtGame, István Fábián and Ferenc Staengler, along with musician György Dragon, who joined them in 1989. The game was inspired by Advanced Dungeons & Dragons and Dungeon Master tabletop role-playing games. Starting in spring 1990 the company pitched the game to several publishers, including Electronic Arts, but they were finalizing the publishing deal for a similar game, Raven Software's Black Crypt just a week before, so they rejected the game. The game was finished and tested by January 1992, a month before its release. The developers received little to no compensation for their work on the game, they were even banned from the game's Hungarian launch event.

Reception

Amiga Power gave the Amiga version of Abandoned Places an overall score of 80%, praising the size of the game world, and expressed that Abandoned Places'  leverage over other similar RPGs is that it has extensive above-ground locations in addition to its subterranean dungeons, furthermore stating that "what you do above ground is every bit as important as your endeavours below." Amiga Power also praises Abandoned Places'  level of difficulty, but criticises its "poor" graphics, calling its animations "lackluster" and almost '8-bit' looking in combat, expressing that "when so much effort has been put into every other aspect of something as huge as Abandoned Places, it seems a shame that it's so completely outgunned in such a very important area."

References

External links

Abandoned Places: A Time For Heroes at Hall of Light Amiga database
Abandoned Places 2 at Hall of Light Amiga database

1992 video games
Amiga games
DOS games
Europe-exclusive video games
First-person party-based dungeon crawler video games
Role-playing video games
Video games developed in Hungary